The Spring and Autumn Annals of Wu and Yue is an unofficial history from the time of the Eastern Han dynasty that consists of a collection sidenotes on historical events. The ten-volume book was written by Zhao Ye (赵晔), and narrates the history of battles between the states of Wu and Yue during the Spring and Autumn period. The text is richly styled and detailed in a way that resembles texts from the School of "Minor-talks" (小說家/小说家; Xiaoshuojia) within the Hundred Schools of Thought.

The Spring and Autumn Annals of Wu and Yue is considered a follow-up of the Lost Book of Yue (越絕書). The annals have several modern commentaries and revised versions.

Contents
 volume 1: Biography of Taibo
 volume 2: Biography of Shoumeng, King of Wu
 volume 3: The story of how King Liao put Prince Guang into office
 volume 4: Inner biography of King Helü
 volume 5: Inner biography of King Fuchai
 volume 6: External biography of King Wuyu of Yue
 volume 7: External story of how King Goujian became a servant
 volume 8: External story of how Goujian returned home
 volume 9: External story of Goujian's schemes
 volume 10: External story of how Goujian overcame Wu

References

Han dynasty texts
Wu (state)
Yue (state)
1st-century history books